This is a list of diplomatic missions of Sweden. Sweden has a moderately sized diplomatic network of 78 embassies and 7 consulates general, supplemented by honorary consulates, cultural centres and trade missions. In countries without Swedish representation, Swedish citizens can seek assistance from public officials in the foreign services of any of the other Nordic countries, in accordance with the Helsinki Treaty.

Of note Sweden was the first Western country to have an embassy in Pyongyang. The embassy in Pyongyang continues to provide limited consular services to citizens of several Western countries without a presence in North Korea and acts as the consular protecting power of the United States, Canada, and Australia since 1995.

In January 2010, the Swedish Foreign Ministry announced that its embassies in Bratislava (Slovakia), Dakar (Senegal), Dublin (Ireland), Ljubljana (Slovenia), Luxembourg (Luxembourg), and Sofia (Bulgaria) would be closed down, while existing section offices in Pristina, Tbilisi, Chisinau, Tirana, Bamako, Ouagadougou, Monrovia, Kigali, La Paz and Phnom Penh would be upgraded to embassies.

In December 2010, it was announced by the Swedish Foreign Ministry that an additional five embassies would close down; the embassies affected were the ones in Brussels, Belgium, Buenos Aires, Argentina, Hanoi, Vietnam, Kuala Lumpur, Malaysia and Luanda, Angola.

In August 2011, an agreement between the Social Democrats and the governing Reinfeldt Cabinet was announced, with the purpose of keeping the Swedish embassies in Argentina, Vietnam, Malaysia and Angola open.

On August 30, 2012, Sweden closed its embassy in Minsk, with the Estonian Embassy charged with representing Swedish interests in Belarus.

On November 2, 2016 the Swedish Embassy was re-opened in Lima, Peru. Six days later, on November 8, the Swedish Embassy in Manila, Philippines, was re-opened, eight years after it was closed down.

In November 2021 the Swedish government announced that it would re-open embassies in Dublin and Brussels and a consulate-general in San Francisco. In November 2022, the Embassy of Sweden, Luanda closed.

Africa

 Algiers (Embassy)

 Ouagadougou (Embassy)

 Kinshasa (Embassy)

 Cairo (Embassy)

 Addis Ababa (Embassy)

 Nairobi (Embassy)

 Monrovia (Embassy)

 Bamako (Embassy)

 Rabat (Embassy)

 Maputo (Embassy)

 Abuja (Embassy)

 Kigali (Embassy)

 Pretoria (Embassy)

 Khartoum (Embassy)

 Dar es Salaam (Embassy)

 Tunis (Embassy)

 Kampala (Embassy)

 Lusaka (Embassy)

 Harare (Embassy)

Americas

 Buenos Aires (Embassy)

 La Paz (Embassy)

 Brasília (Embassy)

 Ottawa (Embassy)

 Santiago (Embassy)

 Bogotá (Embassy)

 Havana (Embassy)

 Guatemala City (Embassy)

 Mexico City (Embassy)

 Washington, D.C. (Embassy)
 New York City (Consulate-General)

Asia

 Yerevan (Embassy)

 Baku (Embassy)

 Dhaka (Embassy)

 Beijing (Embassy)
 Hong Kong (Consulate-General)
 Shanghai (Consulate-General)

 Nicosia (Embassy)

 Tbilisi (Embassy)

 New Delhi (Embassy)
 Mumbai (Consulate-General)

 Jakarta (Embassy)

 Tehran (Embassy)

 Baghdad (Embassy)

 Tel Aviv (Embassy)
 Jerusalem (Consulate-General)

 Tokyo (Embassy)

 Amman (Embassy)

 Astana (Embassy)

 Beirut (Embassy)

 Kuala Lumpur (Embassy)

 Pyongyang (Embassy)

 Islamabad (Embassy)
 
 Jerusalem (Consulate-General)

Manila (Embassy)

 Doha (Embassy)

 Riyadh (Embassy)

 Singapore (Embassy)

 Seoul (Embassy)

 Damascus (Embassy)

 Taipei (Swedish Trade and Invest Council)

 Bangkok (Embassy)

 Ankara (Embassy)
 Istanbul (Consulate-General)

 Abu Dhabi (Embassy)

 Hanoi (Embassy)

Europe

 Tirana (Embassy)

 Vienna (Embassy)

 Minsk (Embassy)

 Sarajevo (Embassy)

 Zagreb (Embassy)

 Prague (Embassy)

 Copenhagen (Embassy)

 Tallinn (Embassy)

 Helsinki (Embassy)
 Mariehamn (Consulate-General)

 Paris (Embassy)

 Berlin (Embassy)

 Athens (Embassy)

Stockholm (Embassy)
Rome (Chancery)

 Budapest (Embassy)

 Reykjavík (Embassy)

 Dublin (Embassy)

 Rome (Embassy)

 Pristina (Embassy)

 Riga (Embassy)

 Vilnius (Embassy)

 Chişinău (Embassy)

 The Hague (Embassy)

 Skopje (Embassy)

 Oslo (Embassy)

 Warsaw (Embassy)

 Lisbon (Embassy)

 Bucharest (Embassy)

 Moscow (Embassy)
 Saint Petersburg (Consulate-General)

 Belgrade (Embassy)

 Madrid (Embassy)

 Bern (Embassy)

 Kyiv (Embassy)

 London (Embassy)

Oceania

 Canberra (Embassy)

Multilateral organizations
 Brussels (Permanent Missions to the European Union and NATO)
 Geneva (Permanent Mission to the Office of the United Nations and other international organizations)
 New York City (Permanent Mission to the United Nations)
 Strasbourg (Mission to the Council of Europe)
 Paris (Permanent Missions to the Organisation for Economic Co-operation and Development and UNESCO)
 Vienna (Mission to the Organization for Security and Co-operation in Europe)

Gallery

See also
 Foreign relations of Sweden
 Sweden and the United Nations
 List of diplomatic missions of the Nordic countries

Notes

References

External links
 Official website of Ministry of Foreign Affairs of Sweden

Diplomatic missions
 
Sweden